The 11th FINA Synchronised Swimming World Cup was held September 14–17, 2006 in Yokohama, Japan. It featured swimmers from 29 nations, swimming in four events: Solo, Duet, Team and (for the first time) Free Combination.

Participating nations
Nations who swam in one or more events at the 2006 Synchro World Cup were:

Results

Final standings

Also ranked, but with no points listed were: 13th-Macau, 14th-China, 15th-Greece, 16th-Israel, 17th-Czech Republic, 18th-Slovakia, 19th-New Zealand, 20th-Vietnam, 21st-South Korea, 22nd-Kazakhstan, 23rd-Belarus, 24th-Liechtenstein, 25th-Uzbekistan, 26th-Malaysia, 27th-Costa Rica, 28th-Indonesia.

References

FINA Synchronized Swimming World Cup
2006 in synchronized swimming
International aquatics competitions hosted by Japan
Synchronized swimming competitions in Japan